Juan Guillermos Island (also known as Isla Esmeralda) is a Chilean island in the Queen Adelaide Archipelago in Magallanes and Antártica Chilena Region. It is named after the English Captain John Williams Wilson.

It is located north of Cochrane Island, south-west of Barros Arana and Pedro Montt Islands.

See also
 List of islands of Chile

References

External links
 Islands of Chile @ United Nations Environment Programme
 World island information @ WorldIslandInfo.com
 South America Island High Points above 1000 meters
 United States Hydrographic Office, South America Pilot (1916)

Queen Adelaide Archipelago
Islands of Magallanes Region

es:Archipiélago Reina Adelaida#Isla Juan Guillermos